The War Against the West is a critical study of German National Socialism written by Aurel Kolnai and published in 1938. It describes German National Socialism as diametrically opposed to the [classical] liberal, democratic, Constitutional, and free-enterprise "Western" tendencies found mainly within Britain and the United States.

Overview
During the twenties and thirties, Kolnai, who converted to Catholicism under the influence of G.K. Chesterton, read extensively in the German language fascist and national socialist literature.  The book compiles and critiques the anti-Enlightenment works of national socialist writers themselves. Kolnai's study was the first comprehensive survey in English of German national socialist ideology as a counter-revolution against what German thinkers saw as the materialistic, rootless civilizations dominated by comfort-addicted, money-and-security-centered, liberal bourgeois and rootless cosmopolitan Jews; the antithesis of the heroic model of more vital civilizations, prepared to risk their lives, to die for ostensibly "higher" ideals. Kolnai argues that national socialist ideology is not only alien to the West, but profoundly disturbing and dangerous.

Kolnai described the German national socialists' war against the West as, in essence, a war of paganism against Christian civilization. In citations from Hitler, Goebbels, and others, Kolnai sought to expose what he saw as "the obsessive German national socialist effort to replace Christianity with a crude and barbaric form of pagan religion, to twist the cross of Christ into a swastika."

Contents

References

External links
 Transcript of remarks on the book Occidentalism: The West in the Eyes of Its Enemies by Ian Buruma, on 8 April 2004, at the Carnegie Council Books for Breakfast.
 Kolnai's Political Memoirs, reviewed by Lee Congdon of James Madison University.  Discusses The War Against the West
 1938: Literature, World from Collier's Year Book.
 The Spirit of Nazism, a review of The War Against the West by Hans Kohn, in The Nation, Vol. 147, 1 October 1938. 
 Aurel Kolnai and the Metaphysics of Political Conservatism by John P. Hittinger.
 The War Against the West Chapter V: Faith and Thought, The War Against the West, Aurel Kolnai

1938 non-fiction books
Books about Nazism

de:Aurel Kolnai